The King's Speech: How One Man Saved the British Monarchy (2010) is a non-fiction, biographical book written by Peter Conradi and Mark Logue. Logue's grandfather, Lionel Logue, was a speech and language therapist who helped Prince Albert, Duke of York, (later George VI) manage his difficulties in public speaking with a severe stutter.

Adaptations
The 2010 historical drama film The King's Speech is based on Lionel Logue's experience with Prince Albert.
The 2012 play The King's Speech, written by David Seidler, is based on the film.

References

British historical novels
British novels adapted into films
Cultural depictions of George VI